Knut Johan Gustaf Johansson (22 September 1902 – 20 June 1987) was a Swedish footballer who played for Westermalms and AIK Fotboll. He featured twice for the Sweden national football team in 1930, scoring two goals.

Career statistics

International

International goals
Scores and results list Sweden's goal tally first.

References

1902 births
1987 deaths
Swedish footballers
Sweden international footballers
Association football forwards
AIK Fotboll players